Mall Aventura Plaza Arequipa is a shopping mall in Pongoroche, Arequipa, Peru. It was built in the former Hipodromo de Porongoche. It is open to the public. Stores in this mall include Ripley, Falabella, Tottus, xiaomi, Sodimac, Cinemark, Cibertec, Clínica Internacional, Euroidiomas, Chuck E. Cheese, MAC Cosmetics.

References

Shopping malls in Peru
Buildings and structures in Arequipa
Buildings and structures completed in 2010